Mietens syndrome is a autosomal recessive disorder first described by Mietens and Weber. The condition is named after a German physician named Carl Mietens.

Only 9 cases have been reported.


Symptoms and signs

 Intellectual disability
 Flat feet
 Crossed eyes
 Severe postnatal growth retardation
 Nystagmus
 Narrow nose
 Short forearm bones
 Absent proximal radial epiphyses
 Autosomal recessive inheritance
 Dislocated radial head
 Sclerocornea has been reported in this condition.

History 
In 1966, Carl Mietens and Helge Weber reported  cases of four children, 3 sisters and 1 brother. Who suffered from a cluster of congenital anomalies and mental retardantion.

In 2006, two documented has been reported.

References 

Autosomal recessive disorders